Frank Lappin Horsfall, Jr. (Seattle,  December 14, 1906 – New York City, February 19, 1971) was an American microbiologist specializing in pathology. He worked at the Rockefeller Institute, New York, from 1934 to 1960 and in the early 1950s ran the Virology Laboratory there. The Tamm–Horsfall protein was first purified in 1952 during his work with Igor Tamm.

He was elected in 1948 a member of the United States National Academy of Sciences. He was later elected to the American Philosophical Society in 1956 and the American Academy of Arts and Sciences in 1967. He was the president of the American Association of Immunologists for the academic year 1967–1968.

A collection of his papers is held at the National Library of Medicine.

References

 Who Was Who in America: with World Notables. 1969–1973, Marquis Who's Who, 1973
"Frank Lappin Horsfall, Jr." by George K. Hirst

1906 births
1971 deaths
American pathologists
Physicians from Seattle
University of Washington alumni
McGill University alumni
Members of the United States National Academy of Sciences

Members of the American Philosophical Society